Alfred Ralph Jordan (1900–1969) was an Irish footballer who played in the Football League for Stoke.

Career
Jordan was born in Belfast and played for local side Willowfield where he was a decent defender. This attracted to attention of English club Stoke who signed Jordan in 1923. However, he failed to make it at the Victoria Ground and managed just two appearances in 1923–24 before joining Hull City. He never made it in the English game and after a short spell with Bristol Rovers he returned to Ireland with Dundalk.

Career statistics

References

Association footballers from Northern Ireland
Bristol Rovers F.C. players
Hull City A.F.C. players
Stoke City F.C. players
English Football League players
1900 births
1969 deaths
Dundalk F.C. players
Willowfield F.C. players
Association football fullbacks